Hlebavičiai or Hlebowicz family were a magnate family of the Grand Duchy of Lithuania from the 15th to 17th centuries. They originated from Lithuania Proper and they were Roman Catholic.

The family is mentioned in The Trilogy of Henryk Sienkiewicz.

Notable members
Hleb (15th century) - founder of the family, voivode of Smolensk
Stanisław Hlebowicz (d 1513) - voivode of Polotsk
Mikołaj Hlebowicz (d 1514) - starost of Drohiczyn and Slonim
Jerzy Hlebowicz (d. 1520) - voivode of Smolensk
Jan Hlebowicz (1480–1549) - voivode of Vilna, Grand Chancellor of Lithuania
Mikołaj II Hlebowicz (d. 1632) - voivode of Smolensk, castellan of Vilna
Jerzy Karol Hlebowicz (d. 1669) - voivode of Smolensk
Henryk Hlebowicz (1904–1941) - blessed in Catholic Church

References 

Surnames
Lithuanian noble families